The 1906 New Hampshire football team was an American football team that represented New Hampshire College of Agriculture and the Mechanic Arts during the 1906 college football season—the school became the University of New Hampshire in 1923.  Under first-year head coach Edward Herr, the team finished with a record of 2–5–1.

Schedule
This season introduced several rules changes, most notably legalization of the forward pass (with restrictions).

Scoring during this era awarded five points for a touchdown, one point for a conversion kick (extra point), and four points for a field goal.  Teams played in the one-platoon system, and games were played in two halves rather than four quarters.

The Vermont game in Manchester was attended by Governor of New Hampshire John McLane.

New Hampshire's second team (reserves) lost to Brewster Academy in Wolfeboro, New Hampshire, 11–5, and defeated Mohawk Athletic Club of Portsmouth, 5–0.

Roster
The team photo consists of 14 players—likely all of the team's lettermen—plus coach Edward Herr and the student team manager.

In December 1908, center Carl Chase and another student drowned while canoeing in the nearby Great Bay. Quarterback John J. Ryan later played for Dartmouth College, where he captained the 1910 Dartmouth football team; he subsequently became a college sports coach, including two seasons each with the Wisconsin football team and the Marquette basketball team. Right end Edson D. Sanborn later coached the Student Army Training Corps (SATC) personnel of the 1918 New Hampshire football team that competed in place of the varsity. Team manager Leon Dexter Batchelor later became a horticulture professor and served as director of the University of California Citrus Experiment Station.

Notes

Further reading

References

New Hampshire
New Hampshire Wildcats football seasons
New Hampshire football